Pekan Sepang is a small border town and also a mukim in Sepang District, Selangor, Malaysia. The Sepang International Circuit in the western part of the town, where the Malaysian F1 Grand Prix was and Malaysian MotoGP Grand Prix is held. Malaysia's largest airport Kuala Lumpur International Airport in the western part of the town.

Administrative divisions 
The area of Mukim Sepang covers 198.08 km². There are 6 Malay villages, 2 Chinese New villages and 31 neighbourhoods in this mukim.

Schools
 SJK (C) Sepang

References

External links 

Sepang District
Towns in Selangor